The Muqaddimah ( "Introduction"), also known as the Muqaddimah of Ibn Khaldun  or Ibn Khaldun's Prolegomena, is a book written by the Arab historian Ibn Khaldun in 1377 which presents a view of universal history. Some modern thinkers view it as the first work dealing with the social sciences of sociology, demography, and cultural history. The Muqaddimah also deals with Islamic theology, historiography, the philosophy of history, economics, political theory, and ecology. It has also been described as a precursor or an early representative of social Darwinism, and Darwinism.

Ibn Khaldun wrote the work in 1377 as the introduction and the first book of his planned work of world history, the Kitab al-ʿIbar ("Book of Lessons"; full title: Kitābu l-ʻibari wa Dīwāni l-Mubtada' wal-Ḥabar fī ayāmi l-ʻarab wal-ʿajam wal-barbar, waman ʻĀsarahum min Dhawī sh-Shalṭāni l-Akbār, i.e.: "Book of Lessons, Record of Beginnings and Events in the history of the Arabs and Foreigners and Berbers and their Powerful Contemporaries"), but already in his lifetime it became regarded as an independent work on its own.

Etymology
Muqaddimah is an Arabic word used to mean "prologue" or "introduction", to introduce a larger work.

History of the Muqaddimah 

Ibn Khaldun wrote the first version of the Muqaddimah in Qalʿat ibn Salama, where he secluded himself for almost four years after withdrawing from political life. It is the first of three parts of a project he worked on for almost thirty years: his Kitab al-ʿIbar, a massive work of universal history filling seventeen volumes of 500 pages each in its modern edition. A draft of the Muqaddimah was completed in 1377. Manuscripts of the Muqaddimah copied in the lifetime of Ibn Khaldun of the Muqaddimah are extant, and a number of them have autographed marginal notes or additions.

In the Muqaddimah, Ibn Khaldun expounds on a "new science" around which he had maintained secrecy up until his retirement to Qalʿat ibn Salama, a new science for the study of what he calls "ʿumrān". This new science, ʿilm al-ʿumrān, is based on Greco-Arab philosophy and seeks to study the evolution of humankind and society throughout history using a method that is essentially historical, empirical, rational, and demonstrative. 

The Muqaddimah shaped by Ibn Khaldun's characteristic moderation with regard to politics and religion—was met without much enthusiasm or clear hostility in the first few centuries after it was written. It was alluded to in the works of two Moroccan writers, Muḥammad Ibn al-Sakkāk (d. 1413) and Yaʿqūb b. Mūsā al-Saytānī, but Muḥammad b. ʿAlī Ibn al-Azraq (d. 1496) is apparently the only contemporary writer of the Maghreb who clearly approved of his work, quoting from it abundantly in his Badāʾiʿ al-silk fī ṭabāʾiʿ al-mulk.

It was cited more often in works from Egypt, celebrated by disciples including Al-Maqrizi (1364–1442) and Ibn ʿAmmār, and met with hostility by others such as Ibn Hajar al-Asqalani and his master Nur al-Din al-Haythami.

In the following centuries, Khaldun appeared prominently, described as an authority on political history, in numerous biographical dictionaries—especially in Ahmed Muhammad al-Maqqari's —but the Muqaddimah remained largely absent.

Ottoman historians including Kâtip Çelebi (d. 1657) and Mustafa Naima (d. 1716) valued the social and political theories in the Muqaddimah, but did not apply them in the analysis of their own society.

Abdesselam Cheddadi concludes that "the strictly scientific contribution of Ibn Khaldūn to the field of history and the social sciences was not fully recognised in the Muslim world until the late nineteenth century."

In 1858, the year following the first publication in Cairo, Étienne-Marc Quatremère printed an edition of the Arabic text of the Muqaddimah in three volumes in Paris under the title Les Prolégomènes d’Ebn Khaldoun. William McGuckin de Slane published a French translation in three volumes in 1863 that Aziz al-Azmeh regards as the best translation of Ibn Khaldun's text.

An English translation was published by Franz Rosenthal in 1958.

Sociology

ʿAsabiyyah

The concept of "ʿasabiyyah" (Arabic: "tribalism, clanism, communitarism", or in a modern context, "group feeling" , "social cohesion", "solidarity" or even "nationalism") is one of the best known aspects of the Muqaddimah. As this ʿasabiyyah declines, another more compelling ʿasabiyyah may take its place; thus, civilizations rise and fall, and history describes these cycles of ʿasabiyyah as they play out.

Ibn Khaldun argues that each dynasty has within itself the seeds of its own downfall. He explains that ruling houses tend to emerge on the peripheries of great empires and use the unity presented by those areas to their advantage in order to bring about a change in leadership. As the new rulers establish themselves at the center of their empire, they become increasingly lax and more concerned with maintaining their lifestyles. Thus, a new dynasty can emerge at the periphery of their control and effect a change in leadership, beginning the cycle anew.

Economics

Ibn Khaldun wrote on economic and political theory in the Muqaddimah, relating his thoughts on ʿasabiyyah to the division of labor: the greater the social cohesion, the more complex the division may be, the greater the economic growth:

Ibn Khaldun noted that growth and development positively stimulate both supply and demand, and that the forces of supply and demand are what determine the prices of goods. He also noted macroeconomic forces of population growth, human capital development, and technological developments effects on development. Ibn Khaldun held that population growth was a function of wealth.

He understood that money served as a standard of value, a medium of exchange, and a preserver of value, though he did not realize that the value of gold and silver changed based on the forces of supply and demand. Ibn Khaldun also introduced the labor theory of value. He described labor as the source of value, necessary for all earnings and capital accumulation, obvious in the case of craft. He argued that even if earning "results from something other than a craft, the value of the resulting profit and acquired (capital) must (also) include the value of the labor by which it was obtained. Without labor, it would not have been acquired."

Ibn Khaldun describes a theory of prices through his understanding that prices result from the law of supply and demand. He understood that when a good is scarce and in demand, its price is high and when the good is abundant, its price is low. 

His theory of ʿasabiyyah has often been compared to modern Keynesian economics, with Ibn Khaldun's theory clearly containing the concept of the multiplier. A crucial difference, however, is that whereas for John Maynard Keynes it is the middle class's greater propensity to save that is to blame for economic depression, for Ibn Khaldun it is the governmental propensity to save at times when investment opportunities do not take up the slack which leads to aggregate demand.

Another modern economic theory anticipated by Ibn Khaldun is supply-side economics. He "argued that high taxes were often a factor in causing empires to collapse, with the result that lower revenue was collected from high rates." He wrote:

Laffer curve
Ibn Khaldun introduced the concept now popularly known as the Laffer curve, that increases in tax rates initially increase tax revenues, but eventually the increases in tax rates cause a decrease in tax revenues. This occurs as too high a tax rate discourages producers in the economy.

Ibn Khaldun used a dialectic approach to describe the sociological implications of tax choice (which now forms a part of economics theory):

This analysis is very similar to the modern economic concept known as the Laffer curve. Laffer does not claim to have invented the concept himself, noting that the idea was present in the work of Ibn Khaldun and, more recently, John Maynard Keynes.

Historiography

The Muqaddimah is also held to be a foundational work for the schools of historiography, cultural history, and the philosophy of history. The Muqaddimah also laid the groundwork for the observation of the role of state, communication, propaganda and systematic bias in history.

Franz Rosenthal wrote in the History of Muslim Historiography:

Historical method
The Muqaddimah states that history is a philosophical science, and historians should attempt to refute myths. Ibn Khaldun approached the past as strange and in need of interpretation. The originality of Ibn Khaldun was to claim that the cultural difference of another age must govern the evaluation of relevant historical material, to distinguish the principles according to which it might be possible to attempt the evaluation, and lastly, to feel the need for experience, in addition to rational principles, in order to assess a culture of the past. Ibn Khaldun often criticized "idle superstition and uncritical acceptance of historical data". As a result, he introduced a scientific method to the study of history, which was considered something "new to his age", and he often referred to it as his "new science", now associated with historiography.

Philosophy of history
Ibn Khaldun is considered a pioneer of the philosophy of history. Dawood writes on the Muqaddimah:

Systemic bias
The Muqaddimah emphasized the role of systemic bias in affecting the standard of evidence. Khaldun was quite concerned with the effect of raising the standard of evidence when confronted with uncomfortable claims, and relaxing it when given claims that seemed reasonable or comfortable. He was a jurist, and sometimes participated reluctantly in rulings that he felt were coerced, based on arguments he did not respect. Besides al-Maqrizi (1364–1442), Ibn Khaldun's focused attempt systematically to study and account for biases in the creation of history wouldn't be seen again until Georg Hegel, Karl Marx, and Friedrich Nietzsche in 19th-century Germany, and Arnold J. Toynbee, a 20th-century British historian.

Ibn Khaldun also examines why, throughout history, it has been common for historians to sensationalize historical events and, in particular, exaggerate numerical figures:

Islamic theology
The Muqaddimah contains discussions on Islamic theology which show that Ibn Khaldun was a follower of the orthodox Ash'ari school of Sunni Islamic thought and a supporter of al-Ghazali's religious views. He was also a critic of Neoplatonism, particularly its notion of a hierarchy of being.

The Muqaddimah covers the historical development of kalam and the different schools of Islamic thought, notably the Mu'tazili and Ash'ari schools. Ibn Khaldun, being a follower of the Ash'ari school, criticizes the views of the Mu'tazili school, and bases his criticisms on the views of Abu al-Hasan al-Ash'ari, whom he describes as "the mediator between different approaches in the kalam". Ibn Khaldun also covers the historical development of Islamic logic in the context of theology, as he viewed logic as being distinct from early Islamic philosophy, and believed that philosophy should remain separate from theology. The book also contains commentaries on verses from the Qur'an.

Sharia and fiqh 
Ibn Khaldun was an Islamic jurist and discussed the topics of sharia (Islamic law) and fiqh (Islamic jurisprudence) in his Muqaddimah. Ibn Khaldun wrote that "Jurisprudence is the knowledge of the classification of the laws of God." In regards to jurisprudence, he acknowledged the inevitability of change in all aspects of a community, and wrote:

Ibn Khaldun further described Fiqh jurisprudence as "knowledge of the rules of God which concern the actions of persons who own themselves bound to obey the law respecting what is required (wajib), forbidden (haraam), recommended (mandūb), disapproved (makruh) or merely permitted (mubah)".

Natural sciences

Biology
Some of Ibn Khaldun's thoughts, according to some commentators, anticipate the biological theory of evolution. Ibn Khaldun asserted that humans developed from "the world of the monkeys", in a process by which "species become more numerous" in Chapter 1 of the Muqaddimah:

Ibn Khaldun believed that humans are the most evolved form of animals, in that they have the ability to reason. The Muqaddimah also states in Chapter 6:

His evolutionary ideas appear to be similar to those found in the Encyclopedia of the Brethren of Purity. Ibn Khaldun was also an adherent of environmental determinism. He believed that the black skin, practices, and customs of the people of sub-Saharan Africa were due to the region's hot climate, a theory that according to Rosenthal may have been influenced by the Greek geographical ideas expounded by Ptolemy's Tetrabiblos. Ibn Khaldun viewed the Hamitic theory, where the sons of Ham became black as the result of a curse from God, as a myth.

Shoaib Ahmed Malik has argued that Ibn Khaldun's theory, while remarkable for its acceptance of the kinship between monkeys and humans, should be understood in the context of the late antique and medieval concept of the great chain of being. This theory postulates a linked hierarchy between all entities in creation but is not properly a theory of evolution. The system of the great chain of being implies a graded similarity between the various stages in the hierarchy from minerals to plants, animals, humans, angels, and God, but not a temporal process in which one species originates from the other. While according to some mystical interpretations individual souls may move up the 'ladder' in order to reunite with the divine, the species (or 'substantial forms', in the language of Aristotelian and Neoplatonic ontology) themselves are eternal and fixed. Malik states that quotes from the  like the first one cite above are often given without proper regard for their context. The quote is taken from a section called The Real Meaning of Prophecy, which argues that prophets occupy a place in the great chain of being just beneath angels. In Ibn Khaldun's view, this explains why individual prophets may temporarily ascend to the rank of angels and share with them in the knowledge of the divine, which they may then bring back to humanity in the form of revelation. According to Malik, interpretations that see in this an early form of scientific evolution theory ought to explain how angels, prophets and the upwards ascent of the soul fit into that theory.

Alchemy
Ibn Khaldun was a critic of the practice of alchemy. The Muqaddimah discusses the history of alchemy, the views of alchemists such as Jabir ibn Hayyan, and the theories of the transmutation of metals and elixir of life. One chapter of the book contains a systematic refutation of alchemy on social, scientific, philosophical and religious grounds.

He begins his refutation on social grounds, arguing that many alchemists are incapable of earning a living and end up "losing their credibility because of the futility of their attempts", and states that if transmutation were possible, the disproportionate growth of gold and silver "would make transactions useless and would run counter to divine wisdom". He argues that some alchemists resort to fraud, either openly by applying a thin layer of gold on top of silver jewelry, or by secretly using an artificial procedure of covering whitened copper with sublimated mercury.

Ibn Khaldun states that most alchemists are honest and believe that the transmutation of metals is possible, but he argues that transmutation is an implausible theory since there has been no successful attempt to date. He ends his arguments with a restatement of his position: "Alchemy can only be achieved through psychic influences (bi-ta'thirat al-nufus). Extraordinary things are either miracles or witchcraft ... They are unbounded; nobody can claim to acquire them."

Political theory

In the Muqaddimahs introductory remarks, Ibn Khaldun agrees with the classical republicanism of the Aristotelian proposition that man is political by nature, and that man's interdependence creates the need for the political community. Yet he argues that men and tribes need to defend themselves from potential attacks, and thus political communities are formed. The glue which holds such tribes together and eventually forms "royal authority" or the state, according to Ibn Khaldun, is ʿasabiyyah. He argues that the best type of political community is a caliphate or Islamic state, and argues that the neo-Platonist political theories of al-Farabi and Ibn Sina and the "perfect state" (Madinatu l-Faḍīlah) are useless because God's Law, the sharia, has been revealed to take account of public interest and the afterlife. The second most perfect state, Ibn Khaldun argues, is one based on justice and consideration for public welfare in this life, but not based on religious law and so not beneficial to one's afterlife. Ibn Khaldun calls this state blameworthy. Yet the worst type of state, according to Ibn Khaldun, is a tyranny wherein government usurps property rights and rules with injustice against the rights of men. He argues that if that is not possible for a ruler to be both loved and feared, then it is better to be loved, because fear creates many negative effects in the state's population.

Ibn Khaldun writes that civilizations have lifespans like individuals, and that every state will eventually fall because sedentary luxuries distract them, and eventually government begins to overtax citizens and begin injustice against property rights, and "injustice ruins civilization". Eventually after one dynasty or royal authority falls, it is replaced by another, in a continuous cycle.

The British philosopher-anthropologist Ernest Gellner considered Ibn Khaldun's definition of government, "an institution which prevents injustice other than such as it commits itself", the best in the history of political philosophy.

References

Citations

Sources 

 
 
 
  (previously published as )

External links
 Complete text of the Muqaddimah
 Complete Arabic text of the Muqaddima on Arabic Wikisource
 Copy of Arabic manuscript on Gallica.BNF.fr
 Printed edition of Muqaddimah, 1900
 Printed edition of Muqaddimah, 1900
 Printed edition of Muqaddimah, 1904

1377 books
Islamic culture
Science in the medieval Islamic world
Medieval Arabic literature
Books about civilizations
Books about historiography
Economics books
Sunni literature
14th-century Arabic books